Trooper is a rank used by several civilian state law enforcement organizations in the United States. In its plural form, troopers, it generally refers to sworn members of a state law enforcement agency, state police, state highway patrol, or state department of public safety, even though those officers may not necessarily be of the rank of trooper.

Australia
Early Australian police forces had officers termed troopers, typically mounted police. For example, the classic Australian folk song "Waltzing Matilda" contains the line "Down came the troopers, one, two, three," referring to three mounted police who had come to arrest the swagman. The term is no longer in current usage in Australia.

United States
In the Louisiana State Police, Trooper is a rank below Trooper First Class, and above Cadet. The insignia for this rank consists of a gold colored 'TPR' collar pin worn on the wearer's right lapel. Cadets who complete the state police academy are automatically promoted to Trooper. The title of address is "Trooper".

Wildlife Trooper
Wildlife Trooper Is a rank commonly used in the western United States associated with the duties of a Game Warden.  Currently this title is used in the states of Oregon and Alaska.

See also
Trooper first class
Police ranks of the United States
New Mexico Mounted Patrol Trooper

References

Police ranks